Maria Grötzer (born 2 May 1928) is an Austrian fencer. She competed in the women's individual and team foil events at the 1960 Summer Olympics.

References

External links
 

1928 births
Possibly living people
Austrian female foil fencers
Olympic fencers of Austria
Fencers at the 1960 Summer Olympics
Fencers from Vienna